Live at Royal Festival Hall is an album by Neil Sedaka with the Royal Philharmonic Orchestra was released on the Polydor Records label in 1974. It was recorded on February 2, 1974, at the Royal Festival Hall in London.

Track listing 
All tracks composed by Neil Sedaka and Howard Greenfield; except where indicated
 "I'm a Song, Sing Me"
 "The Other Side of Me"
 "Solitaire" (Neil Sedaka, Phil Cody)
 "For the Good Of the Cause"
 "Let Daddy Know"
 "Laughter in the Rain" (Neil Sedaka, Phil Cody)
 "Our Last Song Together"
 "Medley: Oh Carol, Stairway to Heaven, Little Devil, Happy Birthday Sweet Sixteen, Breaking Up Is Hard To Do, Next Door To An Angel, Calendar Girl"
 "Going Nowhere" (Neil Sedaka, Phil Cody)
 "That's When the Music Takes Me" (Neil Sedaka, Phil Cody)

Personnel
Neil Sedaka - vocals
Andy Summers - guitar
Dave Wintour - bass
Mike Giles - drums
Dave McRae - electric piano
Jacquie Sullivan, Joy Yates, Suzanne Lynch - background vocals
The Royal Philharmonic Orchestra

CD Re-issue
In 1992, Polydor reissued this album on CD in the United Kingdom.

Neil Sedaka albums
1974 live albums
Albums recorded at the Royal Festival Hall
Polydor Records live albums
Royal Philharmonic Orchestra albums